Clarence Henry may refer to:
Clarence Henry (boxer) (1926–1999), American boxer
Clarence "Frogman" Henry (born 1937), American rhythm and blues singer and pianist